The second season  of the animated show Metalocalypse originally aired on Adult Swim from September 23, 2007 to September 7, 2008 with 19 episodes. The show follows virtual death metal band Dethklok. The majority of the music featured this season was released on the 2009 album Dethalbum II, while the song "Impeach God" from the episode "Dethgov" was released as part of Dethalbum III in 2012. The first episode of this season, "Dethecution" was released as part of the deluxe edition of The Dethalbum. This season featured the new re-recorded version of the "Deththeme", released as a hidden track on The Dethalbum.

In May 2015, this season became available on Hulu Plus with all episodes in HD. Some episodes on Hulu Plus, such as "Snakes & Barrels II" contain uncensored nudity and additional graphic violence, however all episodes still contain their original broadcast audio with words such as "fuck" and "shit" bleeped out.

Guests
This season featured several musicians as voice actors, such as Silenoz and ICS Vortex of Dimmu Borgir, Angela Gossow and Michael Amott of Arch Enemy, Samoth, Ihsahn and Trym Torson of Emperor, Exodus, Devin Townsend, Mike Keneally, Richard Christy, Gene Hoglan, Marty Friedman, George "Corpsegrinder" Fisher of Cannibal Corpse, Marco Minnemann, Mike Patton of Faith No More, and Warrel Dane and Steve Smyth of Nevermore. Comedians Laraine Newman and Brian Posehn and actress Frankie Ingrassia also appeared as voice actors.

Special features
Disc One
Dethklok playing band naming game
News report on Klokateers
Toki playing arcade game ("P.R Pickles" deleted scene)
Murderface goes to the opera
Offdensen making phone calls
Mordhaus things
Klokateers clearing Dethboat for landing ("Dethcarraldo" extended scene)
Dethboat being pulled over mountain ("Dethcarraldo" extended scene)
Murmaider music video
 
Disc Two
Nathan Explosion reading William Shakespeare's Titus Andronicus
Dr. Gibbons editing Murderface visual
Edgar Jomfru swim training
The band watching NASCAR ("Dethrace" deleted scene)
Fans on fans ("Black Fire Upon Us" deleted scene)
Offdensen parties with the band ("Dethsources" deleted scene)
Klokateers: In Memoriam
Knubbler interviews Murderface and Toki about the song "Takin' It Easy"
Bloodrocuted music video

Episodes

See also

 List of Adult Swim home videos

References

2007 American television seasons
2008 American television seasons
Metalocalypse seasons